You Who Will Emerge From The Flood is the world's first underwater opera.

It premiered at the Victoria Baths in Manchester, U.K. in May 2009.  It was created by performance artist and opera singer Juliana Snapper and composer Andrew Infanti.  It is part of a larger cycle of pieces that will be performed worldwide.

References 

Operas